Mohan vaidya is a Carnatic singer and musician. He has also worked as a television host and as an actor in Tamil language films and serials like Ramany vs Ramany part 02.

Career
Mohan Vaidhya is the son of noted ghatam artiste K. M. Vaidyanathan and the nephew of music composer G. Ramanathan. He is the elder brother of noted veena player Rajhesh Vaidhya, and his family grew up closely inclined to classical music. Mohan revealed that his voice did not break until his 20s, and that his feminine voice earned him the nickname "Mayil". Mohan learned the violin, taking lessons from Radha Sundaresan. He also took vocal lessons from various gurus such as Tiruvavur Sethuraman, Srirangam Ranganathan, K. C. Thyagarajan and Anayampati Ganesan. Mohan moved to Delhi where he met dancer Saroja Vaidyanathan and began singing for her. He also became the vocalist for Vilasini Natyam exponent Swapna Sundari, Leela Samson, Yamini Krishnamurthy and Bharati Shivaji. 

In the early 1990s, Mohan moved to Chennai and hosted Ragam Sangeetham, a Carnatic music based quiz show on Raj TV. Mohan then moved on to work on films, portraying supporting acting roles in films such as Sethu (1999), Parasuram (2003) and Anniyan (2005). He has since continued to be involved in television, notably appearing in television serials and being one of the judges of Sa Re Ga Ma Pa Challenge on Zee Tamil.

Bigg Boss
In 2019, he was seen as a contestant on Bigg Boss Tamil 3 on Star Vijay. Mohan was subject to controversies as well. He once cited health concerns and swapped the tasks of the toilet with the cleaning duties of the vessel. Host Kamal questioned Mohan about the reasons for the toilet tasks being shuffled. Kamal told Mohan implicitly that no job was superior or inferior to the other.

Mohan was criticized in the social networks for his act of kissing the housemates including female housemates frequently. On one episode, after a drama, Meera Mithun began sobbing uncontrollably, and Mohan went to her and consoled her after some time. He then hugged and kissed the much younger girl. This created a huge controversy on social media. He later clarified to others that she was like a daughter to him. Later during an interview he said that he was always fond of the girls as he was born with three brothers and no sisters and that he genuinely showed affection for them.

Politics 
Mohan Vaidya joined the BJP in 2020. Later, he joined the Amma Makkal Munnetra Kazhagam.

Filmography

Television

Films

References

External links 

 

Tamil musicians
Tamil male actors
Year of birth missing (living people)
Living people
Male actors in Tamil cinema
Indian male classical musicians
Musicians from Tamil Nadu
Bigg Boss (Tamil TV series) contestants